Lord Eldon May refer to

People
Lord Eldon, L.C. (1751 – 1838) 1st Earl of Eldon, PC, QC, FRS, FSA

Ships
Lord Eldon (ship)
Lord Eldon (1801 ship)
Lord Eldon (1802 EIC ship)
Lord Eldon (1824 ship)
Lord Eldon (1830 ship)

Title
Earl of Eldon (1821) title created for Lord Eldon